Mustang Public Schools, often shortened to MPS, is a public school system headquartered in Mustang, Oklahoma and serving pre-kindergarten through 12th grade in Mustang and Oklahoma City.

The district is known state-wide for its unparalleled growth. The number of students in the district increases by about 1000 each year, with about 1,500 more students attending in 2021 than 2020. The district is the largest in the county.

Schools

Secondary
 Mustang High School

Middle
Mustang Middle School
Mustang North Middle School
Central Middle School

Primary

Intermediate
Canyon Ridge Intermediate
Mustang Horizon Intermediate
Meadow Brook Intermediate

Elementary and Prekindergarten
Centennial Elementary 
Mustang Creek Elementary
Mustang Elementary
Lakehoma Elementary
Mustang Trails Elementary
Mustang Valley Elementary
Prairie View Elementary
Riverwood Elementary

All-purpose / Vocational
Mustang Education Center

References

External links
 

School districts in Oklahoma
Education in Canadian County, Oklahoma